Methylene may refer to:

 Methylene group or methylene bridge (CH2< or equivalently -CH2-), a part of a molecule connected to the rest of the molecule by two single bonds.
 An older name for methylidene (=CH2), a part of a molecule connected to another atom by a double bond.
 Methylene (compound) (CH2), an organic compound.

See also
 Bichloride of methylene (30% methanol and 70% chloroform), a variant of the old anesthetic A.C.E. mixture
 Methyl group
 Methylenedioxy
 Mytilene, a city in Greece
 Methanol

de:Methylengruppe
sv:Metylengrupp